HKMA David Li Kwok Po College is a directly subsidised (DSS) college in Hong Kong, using English as the primary medium of instruction.

Founded in 2000, HKMA David Li Kwok Po College provides bilingual and multicultural education to learners in Hong Kong. As an English Medium of Instruction school, all school subjects are taught in English, except Chinese language for junior forms, which is taught in Cantonese.

The college's team of teachers come from Anglophone countries such as Hong Kong, Canada, Malaysia, France, India and the UK. In 2010, the College has maintained a ratio whereby more than 15% of their teaching staff has been recruited from outside of Hong Kong. Furthermore, 97% of its teaching staff possess both recognized university degrees and teaching qualifications.

The Student Council
Opened in 2012, the College has set up a Student Council as a representative of the student body as a whole. The aims of the council are:
 To develop a sense of belonging and a good practice of citizenship in students through the involvement and the organization of activities.
 To reflect the opinions of our schoolmates to the school and enhance the relationship between teachers and the students. 
 To strive for the welfare of our schoolmates
 To hold diversified internal school activities and encourage our schoolmates to participate.
 To encourage our schoolmates to show concern about others in the society.
 To enhance friendships among schoolmates
 To act as role models to the students of the school.
 To broaden the students horizons through joint school activities.
The incumbent Student Council Executive Committee is Abelia (bit.ly/abeliadlkp)

Extracurricular activities
In the 2014-2015 school year, the College offered more activities, including:
 Academic Clubs: Chinese Culture, English, Mathematics, Science, French, Spanish, Social Science. 
 Uniform Groups: Hong Kong Red Cross, Hong Kong Air Cadet Corps. 
 Music Items: Flute, Clarinet, Saxophone, Trumpet and Horn, Handchime, Euphonium & Tuba, Percussion, Acoustic Guitar
 Interest Clubs: Cooking and Handicraft, Chess, Chinese Debate, Photography, Indian Dance, Hiking, Sky Teen Volunteer, Psychology. The Hong Kong Award for Young People (AYP), Reading Club, Drama, Film Appreciation, Campus TV, Art, Korean, Japanese
 Sports Clubs: Badminton, Latin Dance, Table Tennis, Sport Climbing, Basketball, Netball, Dodgeball.
During holidays and school breaks, the College organizes overseas study tours (e.g. linguistic and cultural immersion experiences in the UK, Australia, Singapore, Taiwan, New Zealand, France and Mainland China).

The Hong Kong Management Association
Established in 1960, the Hong Kong Management Association (HKMA) is a non-profit making organisation whose core activity is professional education. The HKMA has been in service in Hong Kong for 50 years. With a membership of more than 13,000 executives, HKMA organises more than 2,000 programmes for more than 50,000 participants annually. Apart from adult education, the HKMA is also concerned with educating Hong Kong's younger population. HKMA David Li Kwok Po College opened in 2000, the second school founded and administered by the HKMA. Dr the Hon David K. P. Li GBM GBS JP, Chairman and Chief Executive of the Bank of East Asia Limited, is the past Chairman of the HKMA.

References

External links

 College website
 HKMA website
 Abelia

Secondary schools in Hong Kong